Ron Clothier was an Australian professional rugby league footballer who played in the 1960s and 1970s. He played for Balmain and Penrith in the New South Wales Rugby League (NSWRL) competition.

Playing career
Clothier made his first grade debut for Balmain in 1964. In the same season, Balmain reached the 1964 NSWRL grand final by defeating North Sydney and then Parramatta in the preliminary final. The opponents in the grand final were the all conquering St George side. Clothier was selected for the grand final team to cover injuries within the side. Clothier played at second row in the final as Balmain took a shock halftime lead over St George before Saints came back in the second half to win 11–6 at the Sydney Cricket Ground. Clothier was also selected to play for New South Wales in 1964 and featured in one game against Queensland scoring a try.

Clothier missed the 1966 NSWRL season due to injury and did not play in the club's grand final defeat against St George. In 1969, Clothier joined Penrith and played 3 seasons with them before retiring at the end of 1971.

References

Balmain Tigers players
Penrith Panthers players
New South Wales rugby league team players
Australian rugby league players
Rugby league players from Sydney
Rugby league second-rows
Rugby league hookers
Year of birth missing
Year of death missing
Place of birth missing
Place of death missing